Man Made Object  is the third album by jazz piano trio GoGo Penguin. It's their first of a three-album deal with the jazz label Blue Note. About the name of their third album, the pianist Chris Illingworth explain that the title is partly inspired by his fascination with ideas of robotics, transhumanism and human augmentation.

Critical reception 
In his review, John Fordham said in The Guardian that "It still feels like clubbing music, but plenty of house and techno fans might be surprised by how good at partying three closet-jazzers can be." Marcus J. Moore said in Pitchfork that "Man Made Object is tailor-made for laid-back enjoyment, to be consumed at a moderate volume without much fuss."

The album charted at number 72 on the UK Albums Chart in February 2016.

Track listing 
Blue Note – 0602547648341:

Personnel
 Chris Illingworth – piano
 Nick Blacka – double bass
 Rob Turner – drums

Charts

References

2016 albums
GoGo Penguin albums